Oenomaus isabellae is a species of butterfly of the family Lycaenidae. It is found in wet and dry lowland forests in French Guiana, Colombia, eastern Ecuador, Peru, Bolivia and Brazil.

References

Butterflies described in 2006
Eumaeini